Bükköy can refer to:

 Bükköy, Devrek
 Bükköy, Kastamonu
 Bükköy, Mustafakemalpaşa